Poeke Castle is a castle near Poeke, a small town in the municipality of Aalter in the Belgian province of East Flanders. Poeke Castle is situated at an elevation of 15 meters.

History

Construction

It is unknown when the first fortification was constructed at Poeke, but references to it appear from 1139 onwards. The castle played a prominent role during the conflict between Count Louis II of Flanders and the city of Ghent in 1382. In the same year Eulaard II of Poeke died at the battle of Beverhoutsveld when he attempted to stop the Ghent militia, who by then had already taken his fort.

The lords of Poeke were loyal vassals of the Counts of Flanders, with whom they also intermarried: Anastasia van Oultre, the second wife of Eulaard III of Poeke, for example, married as her second husband Robert of Flanders, illegitimate son of Louis II of Flanders.

Destruction
During the revolt of Ghent in 1452 against Philip the Good, the castle was taken by the Ghent militia. On 5 July 1452 Philip retook it, and had the Ghent militia present executed and the castle destroyed. The rebuilding most likely took over a century. After the death of Jan III of Poeke in 1563, the lordship became the possession of the de Mastaing family, distant relatives of the lords of Poeke. Jean de Jauche, lord of Mastaing, sold the lordship in 1588 to Philibert Delrye. His son Christoffel Delrye sold the lordship in 1597 to Jean de Preudhomme of Lille.

Rebuilding
Markus-Antonius de Preudhomme d'Hailly carried out rebuilding activities from 1658 to 1664, and in 1671. Whether these activities were effective is unknown, as sources from this period are lacking. Later, Charles Florent Idesbald de Preudhomme d'Hailly, Burgrave of Nieuwpoort, Oombergen, Sint-Lievens-Esse and Schoonbergen, Baron of Poeke and lord of Neuville, Kanegem and Velaine (1716–1792), carried out significant work on the castle between 1743 and 1752.

Pycke de Peteghem
In 1872, Baron Victor Pycke de Peteghem (1835–1875), from Oudenaarde, bought the estates. He immediately initiated rebuilding works that lasted until 1875. The third storey was integrated into a higher roof, and the interior and the gardens were renovated. There remain hardly any elements dating from before 1872. Additionally, the French garden was turned into an English garden.

The Baron's last descendant, burgemeester and Baroness Ines Pycke de Peteghem, was the last resident and owner of the castle. In her will, dated 1951, she bequeathed the entire estate to the charity Nationaal Werk der Katholieke Schoolkolonies ("National Work of Catholic School Colonies"), who came into possession of it after her death in 1955.

Present day

In 1977 the castle and its 56 ha park became the property of the municipality of Aalter, which now uses it for cultural meetings and festivities. It was used as a location for filming interior and exterior scenes for the 2012
BBC/HBO production of Parade's End.

Poeke Castle became an official national monument on 13 October 1943. The park was declared a protected landscape in 1978.

See also
List of castles in Belgium

Notes

Sources
 Camerlinckx, Jan 2007: Het kasteel van Poeke. Eeklo: de Eeckloonaar

External links

 Poeke Castle official website 
Wandering the elegant halls of Poeke Castle Photos and history, in English

Castles in Belgium
Castles in East Flanders
Aalter